Lycée Jean Renoir may refer to:

Schools in France:
 Lycée Auguste et Jean Renoir (Cité scolaire Renoir-Californie) - Angers
 Lycée Jean-Renoir - Bondy
 Collège Jean-Renoir - Boulogne-Billancourt

Schools outside France:
 Lycée Jean Renoir in Munich, Germany